Wild Honey is a 1922 American silent romantic adventure film directed by Wesley Ruggles. Produced and distributed by the Universal Film Manufacturing Company, the film is based on a book of the same title by Cynthia Stockley and stars Priscilla Dean, and features Noah Beery, Sr. and Wallace Beery in supporting roles. It is notable for the first use of a traveling matte special effect.

It is not known whether the film currently survives.

Plot
Despite her father's debt to him, Lady Vivienne refuses to marry the wealthy but villainous Henry Porthen. Porthen devises a plot to lure Vivienne to his country home using her weak-willed friend, Freddy. In the course of events, Vivienne faints, Porthen is killed by his secretary Joan, and Freddy runs away for fear that he will be blamed.

Three years later, Vivienne travels to Transvaal to investigate some problem property she owns. She is rescued from bandits by homesteader Kerry Burgess and the two fall in love. More intrigue brought about by Vivienne's rejection of another suitor, Wolf Montague, leads to the sabotage of a dam and a destructive flood. Vivienne tries to warn the settlers in the flood's path and is herself swept up in it. Burgess rescues her again and they are united.

Cast

Priscilla Dean – Lady Vivienne
Noah Beery, Sr. – Henry Porthen
Lloyd Whitlock – Freddy Sutherland
Raymond Blathwayt – Sir Hugh
Percy Challenger – Ebenezer Learnish
Helen Raymond – Joan Rudd
Landers Stevens – Wolf Montague
Robert Ellis – Kerry Burgess
Wallace Beery – Buck Roper
Carl Stockdale – Liverpool Blondie
Christian J. Frank – Repington
Harry DeRoy – Koos

Production

Cynthia Stockley's novel Wild Honey was purchased by Universal in 1921 with Priscilla Dean already in mind. Brothers Wallace and Noah Beery appeared for the first time in the same feature film.

This was the first film in which a traveling matte process (called the "Williams process" after its inventor) was used. The action of the players was filmed against a black screen, and a scene in miniature of a bursting dam and consequent flood was filmed separately, then the two were combined by the process.

Release
Wild Honey opened in New York at the Central Theatre on February 27, 1922.

Reviews were mostly negative, but many critics singled out the flood scene as impressive and some regarded it as worth the price of admission. The Variety review expressed the opinion that the movie was cheaply made and that, except for the flood scene, the production suffered as a result. Reviewing the film for Life, Robert E. Sherwood called it "a pitifully weak piece of work". The capsule review in Photoplay labeled it "as dull an evening's entertainment as you can find anywhere".

References

External links

Wild Honey lantern slide
Lobby card

1922 romantic drama films
1922 films
American romantic drama films
American silent feature films
Films based on British novels
Films set in South Africa
Universal Pictures films
American black-and-white films
American adventure drama films
1920s adventure drama films
Films directed by Wesley Ruggles
1920s American films
Silent romantic drama films
Silent adventure films
Silent American drama films